Rudra Pratap Singh  (born 6 December 1985) is an Indian former cricketer, who played for the India national cricket team in Test, One Day International and Twenty20 International cricket as a left arm fast-medium bowler. In September 2018, he announced his retirement from all forms of cricket.

Early career
He first came in contention during the Under-19 World Cup in Bangladesh in 2004, when he took eight wickets for a very impressive average of 24.75. He later performed consistently in the Ranji Trophy for Uttar Pradesh and impressive performances saw him earn a place in the ODI side in 2005. In 2015, he switched from UP to Gujarat in the domestic circuit.

International career
In his third one-day match, Singh got his first man of the match award as he played his part as India restricted Sri Lanka to a modest 196 all out. Swinging the ball on a batting wicket, he took 4 important wickets to rattle Sri Lanka. His bowling figures of 8.5 overs, 2 maidens, 35 runs and 4 wickets announced his arrival on the international stage. Singh was selected to make his Test debut in the 2nd Test against Pakistan in Faisalabad, Pakistan in January 2006. He won the man of the match award on his debut after taking 5 wickets in the match.

Singh's 4 wicket-haul in the fourth match of the one-day series against Pakistan in 2006, helped India take an unassailable 3–1 lead in the series, and won him the man of the match award. India went on to win the series 4–1. In his first 11 ODI matches, he was awarded the man of the match award 3 times.

Singh was favoured to Sreesanth for the 2006 ICC Champions Trophy due to his superior economy rate. However, he was unable to maintain his level of performance, and was dropped from the side.

Singh was included in the Test squad for the tour to England and performed well, taking 5/59 at Lord's, his first five-wicket-haul in Tests. In the one-day series he took seven wickets at 31.71 from five matches.

Singh was selected to play in the 2007 ICC World Twenty20 tournament in South Africa in September 2007. Singh emerged as the second-highest wicket-taker in the entire competition, taking 12 wickets in 7 matches at an average of 12.66 runs per wicket. India won the 12-nation tournament after beating Pakistan in the final. R.P. Singh's best figures were 4/13 in 4 overs in India's final Super-8 stage match in which they eliminated South Africa from the tournament.

Singh was then selected for India's one-day home series against Australia and Pakistan that followed, playing four games in each series and picking up a total of 11 wickets.

In August 2011 RP Singh was called up to the India squad for the remainder of the tour of England, he was recalled after a 3-year test absence due to an injury picked up Zaheer Khan which ruled him out of the tour.

Singh played in the fourth test match of the series. Bowling the first over, his first four deliveries were down the leg side. Singh seemed more like a club bowler. His pace was drastically reduced to 120 km/h, and he seemed no threat to the England batsmen. Sir Ian Botham described it as one of the worst opening overs of test cricket he had seen. Sunil Gavaskar also criticised his selection as he was unfit. Other cricket experts and former players felt that Singh was selected only because of his close proximity with then Indian captain MS Dhoni.

Domestic career
In 2006 it was announced that Singh would be signing for English side Leicestershire as their second overseas signing. He was however unexpectedly recalled to the Indian side following their poor World Cup campaign and only made a handful of appearances.

He plays for the Kochi Tuskers in the Indian Premier League, after signing for them in 2011 from the Deccan Chargers. In his second season of the tournament, Singh was highly successful and he emerged as the highest wicket taker of the tournament, with 23 from 16 matches thereby winning the Purple Cap. Deccan Chargers emerged as winners of the tournament. His performance early in the tournament earned him a spot in the Indian squad for the 2009 ICC World Twenty20.He was bought for $600,000 by the Mumbai Indians in the Indian Premier League Players Auction, 2012. In the year 2013 in the IPL he was bought by Royal Challengers Bangalore in the players auction 2013 for $400,000. In the 2014 IPL Auctions, he was unsold and had a base price of Rs 1 crore. He played few matches for Rising Pune Supergiants in 2016 Indian Premier League.

References

External links
 
 Article in Indian Express news paper
 R P Singh IPL Profile

Indian cricketers
India One Day International cricketers
India Test cricketers
India Twenty20 International cricketers
Uttar Pradesh cricketers
1985 births
Living people
Guru Gobind Singh Sports College, Lucknow alumni
Central Zone cricketers
People from Barabanki, Uttar Pradesh
People from Raebareli
Leicestershire cricketers
Deccan Chargers cricketers
Kochi Tuskers Kerala cricketers
Mumbai Indians cricketers
Royal Challengers Bangalore cricketers
India Blue cricketers
India Green cricketers
India Red cricketers
Rising Pune Supergiant cricketers